Verde Village is a census-designated place (CDP) in Yavapai County, Arizona, United States. The population was 11,605 at the 2010 census. It is a retirement and bedroom community for Cottonwood.

History and Economy
Verde Village was developed in 1970 as a retirement community; there were eight units in the original subdivision, Verde Village Units One through Eight. About two-thirds of Verde Village residents are retired.

Geography

Verde Village is located at  (34.708402, -111.992498).

Demographics

As of the census of 2000, there were 10,610 people, 4,071 households, and 2,988 families residing in the CDP. The racial makeup of the CDP was 91.1% White, 0.3% Black or African American, 1.2% Native American, 0.5% Asian, 0.1% Pacific Islander, 4.4% from other races, and 2.4% from two or more races. 11.2% of the population were Hispanic or Latino of any race.

There were 4,071 households, out of which 29.6% had children under the age of 18 living with them, 60.2% were married couples living together, 9.8% had a female householder with no husband present, and 26.6% were non-families. 21.1% of all households were made up of individuals, and 10.0% had someone living alone who was 65 years of age or older. The average household size was 2.53 and the average family size was 2.92.

In the CDP, the population was spread out, with 24.6% under the age of 18, 5.9% from 18 to 24, 23.8% from 25 to 44, 23.9% from 45 to 64, and 21.9% who were 65 years of age or older. The median age was 42 years. For every 100 females, there were 91.4 males. For every 100 females age 18 and over, there were 87.1 males.

The median income for a household in the CDP was $35,075, and the median income for a family was $38,596. Males had a median income of $29,129 versus $21,773 for females. The per capita income for the CDP was $16,734. About 6.7% of families and 8.7% of the population were below the poverty line, including 12.3% of those under age 18 and 4.8% of those age 65 or over.

References

External links
Verde Village community profile from Arizona Department of Commerce
 Cottonwood-Verde Village profile at CityData.com

Census-designated places in Yavapai County, Arizona